"National monument" is the highest designation possible given to historic sites in Taiwan, followed by municipal and county (city) monuments.

According to the Cultural Heritage Preservation Act, Chapter 1, Section 3, historic sites are defined as "architectural works and its ancillary facilities built for the needs of human life, which are of outstanding universal value from the point of view of history, art or science." The first iteration of the Act in 1982 divided these monuments into levels 1, 2, and 3, with 1 being the highest. Subsequent revisions to the act redefined the levels into the designations used today. According to the December 2001 revision, the following sites are known as national monuments:
 Level 1 monuments as of June 30, 1997
 Level 2 monuments in non-special municipalities (everywhere except Taipei and Kaohsiung) as of June 30, 1997
 National monuments designated after June 30, 1997

Meanwhile, all other monuments in special municipalities are designated as municipal monuments, while all other monuments in counties and cities are designated as county (city) monuments. Though the numerical designation is not in official use anymore, they still see use in colloquial usage.

Overview 
As of March 16, 2020, there are 967 historic sites protected under the Cultural Heritage Preservation Act, with 107 designated as national monuments. Tainan City has the most national monuments at 22, followed by Taipei City at 19. Notably, there are no national monuments in eastern Taiwan, though Batongguan Trail does cross into Hualien County.

The Bureau of Cultural Heritage also categorizes the monuments into types, as follows:

List

External links 
 Bureau of Cultural Heritage website

References 

National monuments
 
National monuments